Kayla Noelle Ewell is an American actress known for her roles on television as Caitlin Ramirez on CBS's long-running soap opera The Bold and the Beautiful, as Maureen Sampson on NBC's Freaks and Geeks, and as Vicki Donovan on The CW's The Vampire Diaries.

Early life
Ewell was born in Long Beach, California, and raised in Seal Beach. She studied dance, singing, and acting at the Orange County Song & Dance Company in Westminster, California. Ewell was spotted by a talent agent while taking an acting class around 1999, and asked to go on an audition.

Career
Ewell first appeared on the television series Freaks and Geeks in 2000, playing Maureen Sampson in the episode "Carded and Discarded", directed by Judd Apatow. She starred on the soap opera The Bold and the Beautiful from 2004–2005, and has guest-starred on the TV series The O.C., Boston Public, Veronica Mars, Close to Home and Entourage. She had a role in the film Just My Luck, starring  Lindsay Lohan, and in Material Girls, starring Hilary and Haylie Duff, in 2006. She had a starring role in the film Senior Skip Day.

Ewell co-starred in The CW television series The Vampire Diaries for the first seven episodes in 2009. Ewell described her character, Vicki Donovan, to Star magazine as "a really slutty high school student", and "a troublemaker". Vicki was the first human on the series turned into a vampire. Ewell was killed off the show when her character was staked in the heart by Stefan (Paul Wesley) in order to save Elena (Nina Dobrev) in the Halloween-themed episode "Haunted". Ewell hinted in November 2009 that she was still under contract for the role and might return to the show, but series creator, Kevin Williamson, stated that there were no plans to bring her back. Her character did return however in the finale of the second season, and at the start of season 3.

Ewell played a children's fashion designer in the 2011 Hallmark Channel TV movie, Keeping Up With The Randalls, alongside Thad Luckinbill, Roma Downey, Marion Ross and McKenna Jones. She next appeared on the A&E television series, The Glades, that year, as a waitress suspected of murder in the episode "Beached". In 2012, she guest starred alongside Gabrielle Dennis on the TNT drama, Franklin & Bash, playing a Navy sailor facing a court-martial. Ewell starred opposite Austin Stowell and Danny Glover in the 2013 Hallmark Movie Channel film, Shuffelton’s Barbershop, as Norma, a country music singer and songwriter. The film was named after a 1950s Norman Rockwell painting that featured bluegrass musicians playing in a barbershop.

Ewell starred in the horror film The Demented (2013) alongside Sarah Butler and Michael Welch. She also starred in the 2014 Lifetime movie, Deadly Daycare, with Christy Carlson Romano. In April 2016, Ewell began filming the feature, 2 Years and 8 Days, with Ryan Merriman in New Mexico. The film, retitled 2 Years of Love was released on January 24, 2017. She is playing in full house.

She portrayed Nora Truman (formerly named Mara) in The CW 2019 television series Roswell, New Mexico. In 2020, Ewell guest starred on CW's Batwoman as the DC comics villain Nocturna.

Personal life
As of 2009, Ewell lives in Los Angeles, California. She stated to Sophisticate magazine in 2005 that she enjoys painting, rock climbing, and rappelling in her free time. She also includes dancing and whitewater rafting among her hobbies. She was on her high school's surfing team.

In May 2015, she got engaged to actor and model Tanner Novlan. The couple married on September 12, 2015.

In March 2019, Ewell announced that she and her husband were expecting their first child. On July 16, 2019, Ewell gave birth to their first child, a daughter. In February 2022, Ewell announced that she and her husband were expecting their second child. On June 6, 2022, Ewell gave birth to their second child, a son.

Filmography

Film

Television

Music Video

References

External links

 
 Kayla Ewell Pictures  at Maxim

20th-century American actresses
21st-century American actresses
American child actresses
American film actresses
American television actresses
Living people
Actresses from Long Beach, California
Year of birth missing (living people)